Productivist may refer to:
Productivist art
Belief in productionism